Bryn Mawr is an 'L' station on the CTA's Red Line. It is located at 1119 West Bryn Mawr Avenue in the Bryn Mawr Historic District of the Edgewater neighborhood of Chicago, Illinois. The adjacent stations are Thorndale, located about one half mile to the north, and Berwyn (temporarily closed), about three eighths of a mile to the south. Four tracks pass through the station, but the two western tracks are currently out of service for reconstruction. There is an island platform in the center of the tracks (currently only the western side of the platform is in use) and a side platform adjacent to the western track; Purple Line weekday rush hour express service pass through the station on the same tracks used by the Red Line but do not stop. The name "Bryn Mawr" comes from the SEPTA Regional Rail (and former Pennsylvania Railroad Main Line) station located northwest of Philadelphia in the community of the same name. The name came to the area in the 1880s by Edgewater developer John Lewis Cochran, and is Welsh for "Big Hill."

History
A depot on the Chicago, Milwaukee, and St. Paul Railroad Evanston route was constructed at Bryn Mawr in about 1886. When the Northwestern Elevated Railroad was extended north from Wilson in 1908, taking over from Chicago, Milwaukee & St. Paul Railroad, they opened a station at Bryn Mawr called Edgewater Station. This station was rebuilt to a design by architect Charles P. Rawson when the tracks between Wilson and Howard were elevated onto an embankment in 1921 – the name was changed to Bryn Mawr soon after. The station was extensively renovated in 1974, and an escalator was added. In 2006, the signage at Bryn Mawr was replaced, and three-sided pylons which display maps and schedules were installed in the station house and on the platform.

Services
Bryn Mawr is used by passengers traveling between the Edgewater neighborhood and other parts of Chicago. The station is open 24 hours a day. Trains service Bryn Mawr every four to ten minutes on weekdays, and every six to ten minutes on weekends. Nighttime "owl" service operates every 15 minutes or more.

The station house at Bryn Mawr is located on the south side of Bryn Mawr Avenue. An auxiliary exit is on the opposite side of the street. Outside of the station house are three granite compass roses to help exiting passengers orient themselves. The fare controls at Bryn Mawr are located at ground level inside the station house; past the fare controls, passengers take stairs or an escalator to the island platform. Bicycle storage is available at Bryn Mawr.

Red & Purple Modernization Project
The Bryn Mawr station is being rebuilt as part of this project. The station will receive new wider platforms, new signage, new lights, new security cameras, and new elevators. Reconstruction began in May 2021 and will be completed by December 2024. During Stage A of the reconstruction, the northbound tracks are closed with northbound trains using the southbound side of the current platform. Southbound Red Line trains currently stop at a temporary side platform. Unlike a similar renovation simultaneously occurring at Argyle, where both platforms will use a common temporary entrance, northbound trains will use the existing entrance while southbound trains will use temporary entrance half a block north, not connected to each other inside the paid area. During Stage B (2022-2024), essentially the reverse will happen, with the two northbound tracks being used. However, only southbound trains will stop at Bryn Mawr and a temporary station will open between Bryn Mawr and Argyle at Foster Avenue.

Bus connections
CTA
  36 Broadway 
  84 Peterson 
  92 Foster

Notes and references

Notes

References

External links 

 Train schedule (PDF) at CTA official site
Bryn Mawr Station Page CTA official site
Bryn Mawr Avenue entrance from Google Maps Street View

CTA Red Line stations
Railway stations in the United States opened in 1908
1908 establishments in Illinois